North Nottinghamshire, formally the "Northern Division of Nottinghamshire" was a county constituency represented in the House of Commons of the Parliament of the United Kingdom. It elected two Members of Parliament (MPs) by the block vote system of election.

Boundaries
1832–1885: The Hundreds of Bassetlaw and Broxtowe.

History
The constituency was created by the Reform Act 1832 for the 1832 general election, when the two-seat Nottinghamshire constituency was replaced by the Northern and Southern divisions, each of which elected two MPs.

Both divisions were abolished by the Redistribution of Seats Act 1885 for the  1885 general election, when they were replaced by four new single-seat constituencies: Bassetlaw, Mansfield, Newark and Rushcliffe.

Members of Parliament

Election results

Elections in the 1830s

Lumley-Savile succeeded to the peerage, becoming 8th Earl of Scarbrough and causing a by-election.

Elections in the 1840s

 

Knight's death caused a by-election.

Elections in the 1850s

Elections in the 1860s

Elections in the 1870s
Denison was elevated to the peerage, becoming Viscount Ossington.

Elections in the 1880s

Notes

References 

Parliamentary constituencies in Nottinghamshire (historic)
Constituencies of the Parliament of the United Kingdom established in 1832
Constituencies of the Parliament of the United Kingdom disestablished in 1885